The 2010 Pacific Curling Championships were held from November 16 to the 23, 2010 in Uiseong, South Korea.  The Pacific Championships act as the qualifiers for the 2011 World Curling Championships. The top two women's berths moved on to the 2011 Capital One World Women's Curling Championship in Esbjerg, Denmark, while the top two men's berths moved on to the 2011 Ford World Men's Curling Championship in Regina, Saskatchewan, Canada.

The teams participating in the Pacific Curling Championships first played in a double round-robin where each team played against the other teams twice. The top 4 of each group (men's or women's) moves on to the playoffs. The playoffs include a semifinals round and a finals round. In the semifinals round, the winner is determined with a best-of-five series, the first two games of which are taken from the round robin games. The winners of these best-of-five series then play against each other in the final match.

Women

Teams

Standings

Results

Draw 1
Tuesday, November 16, 14:30

Draw 2
Wednesday, November 17, 8:00

Draw 3
Wednesday, November 17, 16:00

Draw 4
Thursday, November 18, 10:00

Draw 5
Thursday, November 18, 19:00

Draw 6
Friday, November 19, 12:00

Draw 7
Friday, November 19, 20:00

Draw 8
Saturday, November 20, 14:30

Draw 9
Sunday, November 21, 8:00

Draw 10
Sunday, November 21, 16:00

Playoffs
Note: First two games of Semifinals best-of-five are taken from round-robin games.

Semifinals
Monday, November 22, 9:00

Bronze Final
Tuesday, November 23, 12:00

Final
Tuesday, November 23, 12:00

Men

Teams

Standings

Results

Draw 1
Tuesday, November 16, 10:00

Draw 2
Tuesday, November 16, 19:00

Draw 3
Wednesday, November 17, 12:00

Draw 4
Wednesday, November 17, 20:00

Draw 5
Thursday, November 18, 14:30

Draw 6
Friday, November 19, 8:00

Draw 7
Friday, November 19, 16:00

Draw 8
Saturday, November 20, 10:00

Draw 9
Saturday, November 20, 19:00

Draw 10
Sunday, November 21, 12:00

Playoffs
Note: First two games of Semifinals best-of-five are taken from round-robin games.

Semifinals
Monday, November 22, 9:00

Monday, November 22, 14:00

Bronze Final
Tuesday, November 23, 12:00

Final
Tuesday, November 23, 12:00

External links
WCF 2010 PCC Home
2010 PCC
WCF Results Pages: Women Men

Pacific Curling Championships, 2010
Pacific-Asia Curling Championships
International curling competitions hosted by South Korea